Pelvimetry is the measurement of the female pelvis. It can theoretically identify cephalo-pelvic disproportion, which is when the capacity of the pelvis is inadequate to allow the fetus to negotiate the birth canal. However, clinical evidence indicate that all pregnant women should be allowed a trial of labor regardless of pelvimetry results.

Indication
Theoretically, pelvimetry may identify cephalo-pelvic disproportion, which is when the capacity of the pelvis is inadequate to allow the fetus to negotiate the birth canal. However, a woman's pelvis loosens up before birth (with the help of hormones).

A Cochrane review in 2017 found that there was too little evidence to show whether X-ray pelvimetry is beneficial and safe when the baby is in cephalic presentation.

A review in 2003 came to the conclusion that pelvimetry does not change the management of pregnant women, and recommended that all women should be allowed a trial of labor regardless of pelvimetry results. It considered routine performance of pelvimetry to be a waste of time, a potential liability, and an unnecessary discomfort.

Components
The terms used in pelvimetry are commonly used in obstetrics. Clinical pelvimetry attempts to assess the pelvis by clinical examination. Pelvimetry can also be done by radiography and MRI.

Low-dose 3D-rendered CT scans can be used for estimating the main pelvimetry parameters:

History

Traditional obstetrical services relied heavily on pelvimetry in the conduct of delivery in order to decide if natural or operative vaginal delivery was possible or if and when to use a cesarean section. Women whose pelvises were deemed too small received caesarean sections instead of birthing naturally.

Traditional obstetrics have characterized four types of pelvises:
 Gynecoid: Ideal shape, with round to slightly oval (obstetrical inlet slightly less transverse) inlet.
 Android: triangular inlet, and prominent ischial spines, more angulated pubic arch.
 Anthropoid: the widest transverse diameter is less than the anteroposterior (obstetrical) diameter.
 Platypelloid: Flat inlet with shortened obstetrical diameter.

See also
 Childbirth
 List of obstetric topics
 Pelvic Bone Width
 Human pelvis
 Pregnancy
 Pubic symphysis
 Sacroiliac joint
 Sacrum

References

Obstetrical procedures
Pelvis